Arthur Lockwood is the name of:

 Arthur Lockwood (cricketer) (1903-1933), British first-class cricketer
 Arthur Lockwood (politician) (1883-1966), British political activist